The 1955–56 SM-sarja season was the 25th season of the SM-sarja, the top level of ice hockey in Finland. 10 teams participated in the league, and TPS Turku won the championship.

Regular season

Group A

4th place 
 HPK Hämeenlinna - HIFK Helsinki 7:4

Group B

4th place
 Vesa Helsinki - KyPa Karhula 3:2

3rd place
 Tappara Tampere - Ilves Tampere 5:2/2:2

Final 
 TPS Turku - Tarmo Hämeenlinna 7:2/9:3

External links
 Spielzeit bei hockeyarchives.info

Fin
Liiga seasons
1955–56 in Finnish ice hockey